Michel Briand (26 September 1930 – 31 August 2022) was a French sailor who competed in the 1968 Summer Olympics.

References

External links
 

1930 births
2022 deaths
French male sailors (sport)
Olympic sailors of France
Sailors at the 1968 Summer Olympics – Dragon
20th-century French people